Ratna De is an Indian politician who has been serving as Cabinet Minister of State for Environment
Science, Technology and Bio-Technology in the Government of West Bengal. She was a member of the 15th Lok Sabha and 16th Lok Sabha from Hooghly (Lok Sabha constituency), which includes the Singur area. She lost the Lok Sabha Elections 2019 to Locket Chatterjee, who was elected as a BJP candidate from the Hooghly Lok Sabha constituency. In the 2021 election, she was elected as the MLA of West Bengal Legislative Assembly from Pandua Vidhan Sabha Constituency.

She is daughter of Gopal Das Nag, who was Labour Minister in the Congress government under Siddhartha Shankar Ray. In 2001 and 2006, she won the assembly election from Sreerampur (Serampore).

A doctor (MBBS and DCH) by profession, she was Member of the Committee on Petroleum and Natural Gas, Lok Sabha. She was a member of the Panel of chairpersons in the 16th Lok Sabha.

She was sworn in as the Minister of State (Independent Charge) as a part of the 21st Council of Ministers for the state of West Bengal under the leadership of Mamata Banerjee with the portfolios of Department of Environment and Department of Science & Technology and Bio-Technology.

References

Living people
India MPs 2009–2014
Trinamool Congress politicians from West Bengal
1948 births
University of Calcutta alumni
Lok Sabha members from West Bengal
India MPs 2014–2019
Women in West Bengal politics
21st-century Indian women politicians
21st-century Indian politicians
People from Hooghly district